Franca Pamiendi Gbodo (born 1982) was a Nigerian female weightlifter, competing in the 58 kg category and representing Nigeria at international competitions.

She participated at the 2000 Summer Olympics in the 53 kg event, and at the 2004 Summer Olympics in the 58 kg event.
She competed at world championships, most recently at the 2003 World Weightlifting Championships.

Major results

References

External links
 

1982 births
Living people
Nigerian female weightlifters
Weightlifters at the 2004 Summer Olympics
Olympic weightlifters of Nigeria
Place of birth missing (living people)
Weightlifters at the 2000 Summer Olympics
20th-century Nigerian women
21st-century Nigerian women